The 1981 Algerian Super Cup is the  first edition of Algerian Super Cup, a football match contested by the winners of the Championnat National and 1980–81 Algerian Cup competitions. The match was scheduled to be played on 20 August 1981 at 20 August 1955 Stadium in Algiers between 1980-81 Championnat National winners RC Kouba and 1980–81 Algerian Cup winners USM Alger.

Match details

References 

1981
Supercup
USM Alger matches
RC Kouba